The Magritte Museum is an art museum in central Brussels, Belgium, dedicated to the work of the Belgian surrealist artist, René Magritte. It is one of the constituent museums of the Royal Museums of Fine Arts of Belgium. It is served by Brussels Central Station, as well as by the metro stations Parc/Park (on lines 1 and 5) and Trône/Troon (on lines 2 and 6).

Museum
The Magritte Museum opened to the public on 30 May 2009 in Brussels. Housed in the five-level neoclassical Hôtel du Lotto, on the Place Royale/Koningsplein, it displays some 200 original Magritte paintings, drawings and sculptures including The Return, Scheherazade and The Empire of Light. 

This multidisciplinary permanent installation is the biggest Magritte archive anywhere and most of the work is directly from the collection of the artist's widow, Georgette Magritte, and from Irene Hamoir Scutenaire, who was his primary collector. Additionally, the museum includes Magritte's experiments with photography from 1920 on and the short surrealist films he made from 1956 on.

See also

 BELvue Museum
 List of single-artist museums
 Culture of Belgium

References

Notes

Museums in Brussels
Art museums and galleries in Belgium
2009 establishments in Belgium
Art museums established in 2009
René Magritte
Museums devoted to one artist
City of Brussels
Biographical museums in Belgium